Bo Berglund (born 6 April 1955) is a Swedish former professional ice hockey player. After his active career he has also worked as an ice hockey color commentator for Sweden's TV4 Sweden.

Playing career
After having played for Modo Hockey and Djurgårdens IF in Sweden, he left for North America in 1983, joining the Quebec Nordiques. He has also played for the Minnesota North Stars and the Philadelphia Flyers, as well as with the minors. After a total of 130 games in the NHL, he returned home to Sweden in 1986 to play for AIK, where he played until he retired in 1990.  He was a scout for the Buffalo Sabres through the 2015 season. He was awarded the Golden Puck Award following the 1987–1988 season.

Career statistics

Regular season and playoffs

International

References

External links
 

1955 births
AIK IF players
Boston Bruins draft picks
Buffalo Sabres scouts
Djurgårdens IF Hockey players
Hershey Bears players
Ice hockey players at the 1980 Winter Olympics
Ice hockey players at the 1988 Winter Olympics
Living people
Medalists at the 1980 Winter Olympics
Medalists at the 1988 Winter Olympics
Minnesota North Stars players
Modo Hockey players
Olympic bronze medalists for Sweden
Olympic ice hockey players of Sweden
Olympic medalists in ice hockey
People from Örnsköldsvik Municipality
Philadelphia Flyers players
Quebec Nordiques draft picks
Quebec Nordiques players
Springfield Indians players
Swedish expatriate ice hockey players in Canada
Swedish expatriate ice hockey players in the United States
Swedish ice hockey right wingers
Sportspeople from Västernorrland County